General elections were held in Honduras on 22 and 25 April 1877. In the presidential elections on 22 April, the result was a victory for the Liberal candidate, interim President Marco Aurelio Soto, who received 81% of the vote. Congressional elections were held on 25 April.

Results

President

References

Honduras
1877 in Honduras
Elections in Honduras
Presidential elections in Honduras
Election and referendum articles with incomplete results